The 1984 Custom Credit Australian Indoor Championships was a men's tennis tournament played on indoor hard courts at the Sydney Entertainment Centre in Sydney in Australia and was part of the 1984 Volvo Grand Prix. The tournament ran from 8 October through 14 October 1984. Second-seeded Anders Järryd won the singles title.

Finals

Singles

 Anders Järryd defeated  Ivan Lendl 6–3, 6–2, 6–4
 It was Järryd's 2nd singles title of the year and the 4th of his career.

Doubles

 Anders Järryd /  Hans Simonsson defeated  Mark Edmondson /  Sherwood Stewart 6–4, 6–4
 It was Järryd's 6th title of the year and the 19th of his career. It was Simonsson's 2nd title of the year and the 11th of his career.

References

External links
 ITF – tournament edition details

 
Custom Credit Australian Indoor Championships
Australian Indoor Tennis Championships
In
Custom Credit Australian Indoor Championships
Sports competitions in Sydney
Tennis in New South Wales